"Why Baby Why" is a country music song co-written and originally recorded by George Jones. Released in late 1955 on Starday Records and produced by Starday co-founder and Jones' manager Pappy Daily,  it peaked at 4 on the Billboard country charts that year. It was Jones' first chart single, following several unsuccessful singles released during the prior year on Starday.

Recording and composition

Jones's first chart hit, "Why Baby Why", has gone on to become a country standard, having been covered by many artists.  The recording session for "Why Baby Why" took place in Houston, Texas's Gold Star Studios and featured the house lineup of Glenn Barber on lead guitar, Herb Remington on pedal steel guitar, Tony Sepolio on fiddle, and Doc Lewis on piano. The arrangement is upbeat honky tonk, led by a fiddle that plays throughout the song.  Overall, the song has been described as a classic of the "finger-pointin' cheatin' song".  In the liner notes to the retrospective Cup Of Loneliness: The Classic Mercury Years, country music historian Colin Escott observes that part of the song's appeal "lay in the way a Cajun dance number was trying to break free of a honky tonk song."  Jones recorded the backing vocal himself, with help from innovative techniques from engineer Bill Quinn, after a planned appearance by more established singer Sonny Burns did not materialize due to the latter's drinking. According to the book George Jones: The Life and Times of a Honky Tonk Legend, Jones's frequent songwriting partner Darrell Edwards was inspired to write the words after hearing an argument between a couple at a gas station. The lyric sets up the theme of the song:

Credits and personnel
For the 1955 Original recording.

George Jones  – vocals, acoustic
Herb Remington  – steel
Lew Brisby   – bass
Tony Sepolio   – fiddle
Doc Lewis   – piano

Reception
The single's early airplay occurred in Jones' home state of Texas, with Houston's country music station KIKK ranking it number one locally.  Their charts were sent to stations around the country, which began to pick it up as well, partially overcoming Starday's regionally limited distribution. However, its progress on the chart was blunted by Red Sovine and Webb Pierce's cover duet, which benefited from Decca Records' major label status and national distribution and rose to number one on the chart over the 1955–1956 Christmas holiday period. Jones's rendition was later included as the first track on his 1957 debut album Grand Ole Opry's New Star.

Cover versions
Since the release of Jones' rendition, "Why Baby Why" has been covered by several other artists, many of whom have also charted with it.  Jones himself re-recorded it a couple of times as a duet; first with Gene Pitney for their It's Country Time Again! album released in 1966, and with Ricky Skaggs for the 1994 album The Bradley Barn Sessions which featured re-recordings of Jones' songs as duets with various artists.  Two different versions of the song have reached Number One on the country charts, making it one of the only country songs to hold that distinction.  Artists who have had country chart hits with renditions of this song include the following:

Red Sovine and Webb Pierce, #1 in 1956
Hank Locklin, #9 later in 1956
Warren Smith and Shirley Collie, #23 in 1961
Charley Pride, #1 in 1983
Waylon Jennings and Willie Nelson recorded the song for their 1983 album Take It to the Limit.
The Good Brothers, #20 in 1991 in Canada 
Palomino Road, #46 in 1992
Patty Loveless cut the song in 2008.
Peter Grudzien "Early".
Actors Michael Shannon and Jessica Chastain covered the song for the 2022 miniseries George & Tammy.

References

1955 singles
1956 singles
1961 singles
1982 singles
2008 singles
Shirley Collie songs
George Jones songs
Patty Loveless songs
Palomino Road songs
Webb Pierce songs
Charley Pride songs
Red Sovine songs
Hank Locklin songs
Warren Smith (singer) songs
The Good Brothers songs
Male vocal duets
Songs written by George Jones
Song recordings produced by Norro Wilson
RCA Records singles
1955 songs
Starday Records singles
Song recordings produced by Pappy Daily